Motorcycle Diaries is an unreleased Indian Malayalam-language film directed by Rajesh Pillai, starring Kunchako Boban and Nivin Pauly in lead roles. The film is based on the mental relationship between one motorcycle and his previous owner. The film was produced by Sugeeth and Satheesh under the banner of Ordinary Films. Bollywood scenarist Suresh Nair, Tamil writer Jeyamohan and Rajesh Pillai co-wrote the screenplay. Santosh Thundiyil and Aneesh Lal crank the camera for the film. Shaan Rahman composes the music and also makes his debut as an actor. The film started shooting in Kolkata in May 2013.

The film is about motorcycles and the story is narrated through the eyes of a Bullet. From the time it hits the road in the 1970s to present forms the plot. The story narrates how the motorcycle touches an emotional chord in the two lead characters.

Plot
The story is centered around an old motorcycle, which turns out to be a crucial element connecting the emotions of two separate persons. Which one of the characters has nostalgic feeling with bullet while other one has bullet as the spirit. The movie has portraying the emotional war between the owners to the bullet.

Cast
 Kunchacko Boban
 Nivin Pauly
 Vishakha Singh	
 Shine Tom Chacko
 Shaan Rahman

References

External links
 Rajesh Pillai's "Motorcycle Diaries" – sify.com

2016 films
2010s Malayalam-language films
Unreleased Malayalam-language films
Films directed by Rajesh Pillai